The 1965–66 season was Kilmarnock’s 64th in Scottish League Competitions. They finished 3rd out of 18 clubs in Scottish Division One. They competed in the European Cup for the first time and were knocked out by the eventual winners Real Madrid.

Scottish Division One

Scottish League Cup

Group stage

Group 3 final table

Knockout stage

Scottish Cup

European Cup

See also
Kilmarnock F.C. in European football
List of Kilmarnock F.C. seasons

References

External links
https://www.fitbastats.com/kilmarnock/team_results_season.php

Kilmarnock F.C. seasons
Kilmarnock